Tannum Sands State High School (TSSHS or often Tannum High) is a public high school located in Tannum Sands, Gladstone Region, Queensland, Australia. Each grade has an average of about 213 students. It is the first and only secondary school established in the Tannum Sands area. The school receives approximately 95% of the students living in the Tannum Sands catchment area for Year 7 each year.

History
Tannum Sands State High School opened in 1998 with 287 Grade 8 and 9 students. Their first seniors graduated in 2001.

Principals and deputy principals

The following principals and deputy principals have led the school since it was opened:

Ray Johnston; 1998–2016
Kevin Giles; unspecified-2009
John Adie; unspecified-2011
Rohan Brooks; unspecified-2013
Heather Moller; 2009–current
Katrina Baylden; 2011– unspecified
Tarah Vardy; unspecified -current
Patrica Vicary; 2017 -current

Academics

Curriculum
Five mandatory subjects (English, Mathematics, Studies of Society and the Environment, Science and Physical Education) make up the majority of the curriculum until the students choose senior subjects for the duration of their senior schooling (grade 11–12).

The junior students are required to complete five weeks of each elective subject in their first year before they are able to choose their own subjects, which are studied for a further four semesters.

The subjects available for junior students are as follows:

English (mandatory)
Maths (mandatory)
Studies of Society and the Environment (mandatory)
Science (mandatory)
Physical Education (mandatory)
Japanese
Drama (elective)
Drama Extension (elective)
Music (elective)
Music Extension (elective)
Art (elective)
Hospitality (elective)
Textiles (elective)
Business and Technology/ICT (elective)
Manual Arts: Woodwork/Metalwork (elective)

After the four semesters of a student's elective study, English and Maths become the only mandatory subjects, and are able to choose a further four subjects to count towards their Overall Positioning (OP) score and take them to the end of Grade 12.

The subjects available to senior students are as follows:

Senior English or English Communications
Maths A or Maths B or Maths C
Sport
Physics
Biology
Chemistry
Music
Art
Drama
Geography
History
Marine Biology
Hospitality
Textiles
Business and Technology/ICT
Graphics
Manual Arts: Woodwork
Manual Arts: Metalwork

Recent academic achievements
Tannum Sands State High School has a consistent percentage of students graduating in the OP1 to OP5 range each year, with the long-term average sitting at approximately 15%. In 2010, three students received an OP1, with a further five scoring an OP2.

In 2008, Tannum High had three National Sports Champions, and five students represented Queensland in their respective sports. 71 students also tried out for Capricornia at the Port Curtis District Selection, and 41 qualified to represent the Port Curtis region at the Capricornia Regional level. Two students competed in the Olympic Selection Trials that year.

Extracurricular and co-curricular activities

Indigenous education

Tannum Sands State High School is a member of the Australia-wide "Dare to Lead" project, aimed at improving educational outcomes for indigenous students. The school's Indigenous Support Team works on building relationships to engage indigenous community members, tertiary institutions and all school personnel, as well as partnering with Indigenous Role Models and mentors to support students in achieving their goals.

Sport

A range of sporting activities are offered by Tannum High, including skateboarding, dance, ultimate disk, yoga, fishing, soccer, touch football, cricket, basketball, netball, volleyball, bocce and seven-a-side league. Swimming, Athletics, Cross-Country and Beach carnivals are also conducted annually.

The school also competes in interschool team competitions after school against other schools in Gladstone, in sports such as rugby league, netball, volleyball, touch football, soccer and hockey. Students also have the opportunity to nominate for Port Curtis trials in a range of sports.

Extracurricular activities
A range of extracurricular activities is offered. There are varying numbers from year to year depending on staff and student interest.

Instrumental Music (Band and String Orchestra)
Interschool Sport e.g. rugby league, soccer and netball
Optiminds
Student Council Committees
Sport Carnivals
National Competitions e.g. Australian Mathematics Competition
Door knocks and other fundraisers for charity
Port Curtis and Capricornia Region sport trials
Chaplain's Bike-a-Thon ride to Rockhampton
Lunchtime tutoring
Camps and excursions
NAIDOC week
Debating and public speaking
Christian Support Group ("YCATS")
Tour de Chaplain 100 km charity bike ride
School Prayer Group
Human Powered Vehicle (HPV) race in Maryborough

References

Public high schools in Queensland
Schools in Central Queensland
Educational institutions established in 1998
1998 establishments in Australia